The 2003 Euro Formula 3000 Series was scheduled over 10 rounds and contested over 9 rounds. 10 different teams, 26 different drivers competed. All teams raced with Lola T99/50 chassis with Zytek engines.

Driver and team lineup

Race calendar
The season was scheduled to start at Autódromo do Estoril on 27 April, but the round was cancelled by promoter.

Results

Championships standings

† — Drivers did not finish the race, but were classified as they completed over 90% of the race distance.

See also
 2003 International Formula 3000 season

References

External links
Official Euroseries 3000 site

Formula 3000
Auto GP
Euro Formula 3000